Tetragoneura is a genus of flies belonging to the family Mycetophilidae.

The species of this genus are found in Europe, Australia and America.

Species:
 Sciarella mycetophiliformis (Meunier, 1904) 
 Sciophila tenera (Loew, 1850)

References

Mycetophilidae